This is a list of the bus routes operated by the Roads and Transport Authority in Dubai.

Local Bus Routes

CBD Bus Routes

Express Bus Routes

Feeder Bus Routes

Intercity Bus Routes

Night Bus Route

Seasonal Bus Routes

References 



Dubai
Roads and Transport Authority (Dubai)